Michel Le Denmat (born 11 September 1950) is a French former professional racing cyclist. He rode in three editions of the Tour de France.

References

External links
 

1950 births
Living people
French male cyclists
Sportspeople from Côtes-d'Armor
Cyclists from Brittany